Ekadeshma International Short Film Festival or simply Ekadeshma is an annual film festival in Nepal for short film. Ekadeshma began from October, 2012, since the start there have been 5 festivals.

References

External links 

 Official Website
Film festivals in Nepal
2012 establishments in Nepal